Ayaka Nishikawa (born 2 April 1996) is a Japanese professional footballer who plays as a defender for WE League club INAC Kobe Leonessa.

Club career 
Nishikawa made her WE League debut on 12 September 2021.

References 

1996 births
Living people
Sportspeople from Kanagawa Prefecture
Women's association football defenders
INAC Kobe Leonessa players
WE League players
Japanese women's footballers